Goose Pimple Junction is an unincorporated community in Washington County, Virginia, in the United States.

History
Goose Pimple Junction was so named when the domestic disputes of a couple in town were loud enough to give a neighbor goose pimples.

Goose Pimple Junction has frequently been noted on lists of unusual place names. Its road signs are a popular visitor attraction, and have been stolen by souvenir-hunting tourists at least a dozen times.

References

Unincorporated communities in Washington County, Virginia
Unincorporated communities in Virginia